Zygmunt Łoboda (24 April 1895 – 8 April 1945) was a Polish architect. His work was part of the architecture event in the art competition at the 1928 Summer Olympics. He was killed in the Flossenbürg concentration camp during World War II.

References

External links
 

1895 births
1945 deaths
20th-century Polish architects
Olympic competitors in art competitions
Place of birth missing
People who died in Flossenbürg concentration camp
Polish civilians killed in World War II
Polish people who died in Nazi concentration camps